West Milton is a village in Miami County, Ohio, United States. The population was 4,630 at the 2010 census. It is part of the Dayton Metropolitan Statistical Area.

History
The first settlement at West Milton was made in 1807. West Milton was named for John Milton, an English poet. A post office called Milton was established in 1824, and the name was changed to West Milton in 1829. The village was incorporated around 1834.

Geography
West Milton is located at  (39.956453, −84.329489).

Demographics

2010 census
As of the census of 2010, there were 4,630 people, 1,973 households, and 1,298 families living in the village. The racial makeup of the village was 97.4% White, 0.5% African American, 0.1% Native American, 0.3% Asian, 0.2% from other races, and 1.5% from two or more races. Hispanic or Latino of any race were 0.8% of the population.

There were 1,973 households, of which 32.2% had children under the age of 18 living with them, 46.2% were married couples living together, 14.4% had a female householder with no husband present, 5.1% had a male householder with no wife present, and 34.2% were non-families. 30.2% of all households were made up of individuals, and 13.1% had someone living alone who was 65 years of age or older. The average household size was 2.35 and the average family size was 2.89.

The median age in the village was 39.3 years. 25.2% of residents were under the age of 18; 7.8% were between the ages of 18 and 24; 24.6% were from 25 to 44; 25.8% were from 45 to 64; and 16.5% were 65 years of age or older. The gender makeup of the village was 47.5% male and 52.5% female.

2000 census
As of the census of 2000, there were 4,645 people, 1,875 households, and 1,314 families living in the village. The population density was 1,923.9 people per square mile (744.2/km). There were 1,982 housing units at an average density of 820.9 per square mile (317.5/km). The racial makeup of the village was 98.58% White, 0.28% African American, 0.17% Native American, 0.26% Asian, 0.17% from other races, and 0.54% from two or more races. Hispanic or Latino of any race were 0.65% of the population.

There were 1,875 households, out of which 35.7% had children under the age of 18 living with them, 52.5% were married couples living together, 13.2% had a female householder with no husband present, and 29.9% were non-families. 26.7% of all households were made up of individuals, and 12.3% had someone living alone who was 65 years of age or older. The average household size was 2.48 and the average family size was 2.97.

In the village, the population was spread out, with 28.0% under the age of 18, 8.0% from 18 to 24, 29.6% from 25 to 44, 21.3% from 45 to 64, and 13.2% who were 65 years of age or older. The median age was 36 years. For every 100 females there were 92.4 males. For every 100 females age 18 and over, there were 86.8 males.

The median income for a household in the village was $41,905, and the median income for a family was $45,847. Males had a median income of $33,774 versus $25,199 for females. The per capita income for the village was $19,402. About 4.7% of families and 6.7% of the population were below the poverty line, including 10.4% of those under age 18 and 7.4% of those age 65 or over.

Schools
 Milton-Union High School
 Milton-Union Middle School
 Milton-Union Elementary School

Notable people
 Carl Brumbaugh – quarterback and halfback in the National Football League for nine seasons in the 1930s.
 Howard E. Coffin – automobile engineer and industrialist; co-founder of the Hudson Motor Car Company.
 Charles Furnas – The first airplane passenger. Furnas was a mechanic that befriended the Wright Brothers and was helpful in the development of the two-man airplane. 
 Mike Kelly – ranked among the top 25 college football coaches of all time.
 Wes Martin - professional football player
 Bob Schul – the only American to have won an Olympic gold medal in the 5000 metre.
 Ted Studebaker – pacifist and conscientious objector who served as an agricultural worker in Vietnam during the war; killed by North Vietnamese soldiers in 1971.

WMPA-TV
West Milton operates WMPA-TV, an all-volunteer, non-profit Public-access television cable TV station. Founded in the late 1970s, this access station has served the villages of West Milton, Laura, Ludlow Falls, Potsdam and Union Township. It has offered a variety of programming over the years including several sporting events, school functions, church services, and the broadcasting of the West Milton Council Meetings.

External links
Village website
Milton-Union Schools
History of West Milton

References

Villages in Miami County, Ohio
Villages in Ohio